The 1903 DePauw football team was an American football team that represented Lake Forest College in the 1903 college football season.

Schedule

References

DePauw
DePauw Tigers football seasons
DePauw football